Klub malog fudbala Deus, is a Serbian futsal club based in Sremska Mitrovica. Currently competing in the Prva Futsal Liga, which is the premier futsal league in Serbia.

Futsal clubs in Serbia
Sremska Mitrovica